During the 2001–02 English football season, Barnsley competed in the Football League First Division.

Season summary
In the 2001–02 season, after a mediocre start with Barnsley reaching eleventh by mid-September, results started to go downhill and the team found themselves hovering around the relegation zone. Following a 3–1 defeat to Sheffield Wednesday at Hillsborough, Spackman and coach Derek Fazackerley were both sacked. Caretaker manager Glyn Hodges won his first game in charge 3–2 against West Bromwich Albion, however two 3–0 defeats followed against Manchester City and Watford.

Then Rochdale boss, Steve Parkin, was appointed full-time manager on 9 November. Barnsley then went on a twelve-game unbeaten league run from December until mid-February which saw them pull clear of the relegation zone, but from then on results went downhill and Barnsley were dragged back into the mire, with Barnsley's away form being particularly poor and were pretty much reliant upon home victories to get valuable points. Despite a battling effort it came down to the final home game of the season, with Barnsley needing a victory against Norwich City to stave off relegation. On 13 April, Barnsley lost 2–0, and were relegated outside the top two flights of English football for the first time in over twenty years.

Final league table

Results
Barnsley's score comes first

Legend

Football League First Division

FA Cup

League Cup

Squad

Left club during season

References

Barnsley
2001-02